Lonesome Luke Leans to the Literary is a 1916 American short comedy film featuring Harold Lloyd.

Plot
Lonesome Luke (Harold Lloyd) tries to sell books to a businessman and his wife.

Cast
 Harold Lloyd as Lonesome Luke
 Snub Pollard (as Harry Pollard)
 Gene Marsh
 Bebe Daniels

See also
 Harold Lloyd filmography

References

External links

1916 films
1916 comedy films
Silent American comedy films
American black-and-white films
1916 short films
American silent short films
Films directed by Hal Roach
Lonesome Luke films
American comedy short films
1910s American films